In mathematics, particularly algebraic topology, the Kan-Thurston theorem associates a discrete group  to every path-connected topological space  in such a way that the group cohomology of  is the same as the cohomology of the space .  The group  might then be regarded as a good approximation to the space , and consequently the theorem is sometimes interpreted to mean that homotopy theory can be viewed as part of group theory.

More precisely, the theorem states that every path-connected topological space is homology-equivalent to the classifying space  of a discrete group , where homology-equivalent means there is a map  inducing an isomorphism on homology.

The theorem is attributed to Daniel Kan and William Thurston who published their result in 1976.

Statement of the Kan-Thurston theorem 

Let  be a path-connected topological space. Furthermore,
 the induced map  is surjective, and

Notes

References

Homotopy theory
Homology theory